The First Law of Geography, according to Waldo Tobler, is "everything is related to everything else, but near things are more related than distant things." This first law is the foundation of the fundamental concepts of spatial dependence and spatial autocorrelation and is utilized specifically for the inverse distance weighting method for spatial interpolation and to support the regionalized variable theory for kriging. The first law of geography is the fundamental assumption used in all spatial analysis.

Background 

Tobler first presented his seminal idea during a meeting of the International Geographical Union's Commission on Qualitative Methods held in 1969 and later published by him in 1970. Tobler was probably not extremely serious when he originally invoked the first law and instead was explaining limitations brought about by computers of the 1970s. He certainly did not think it would be as prominent in geography as it is today. Though simple in its presentation, this idea is profound. Without it, "the full range of conditions anywhere on the Earth's surface could be packed within any small area. There would be no regions of approximately homogeneous conditions to be described by giving attributes to area objects. Topographic surfaces would vary chaotically, with infinite slopes everywhere, and the contours of such surfaces would be infinitely dense and contorted. Spatial analysis, and indeed life itself, would be impossible."

While Tobler is the first to present the concept as the first law of geography, it existed in some form as a concept before him. In 1935, an R. A. Fisher said "the widely verified fact that patches in close proximity are commonly more alike, as judged by the yield of crops, than those which are further apart." Tobler was made aware of this by a peer-reviewer, and seems to have come up with the first law independently.

Less well known is his second law, which complements the first: "The phenomenon external to an area of interest affects what goes on inside".

Foundation 
The theory is based upon the concept of the friction of distance "where distance itself hinders interaction between places. The farther two places are apart, the greater the hindrance", or cost. For example, one is less likely to travel across town to purchase a sandwich than walk to the corner store for the same sandwich. In this example, hindrance, or cost, can readily be counted in time (amount of time as well as the value of time), transportation costs, and personal muscle energy loss which are added to the purchase price and thus result in high levels of friction. The friction of distance and the increase in cost combine, causing the distance decay effect.

Controversy

Some have disputed the usefulness and validity of Tobler's first law.  In general, some also dispute the entire concept of laws in geography and the social sciences. These criticisms have been addressed by Tobler and others. However, this is an ongoing source of debate in geography and unlikely to be resolved anytime soon.

An anonymous reviewer pointed out that Tobler's first law is remarkably close to a phrase in a book by R.A. Fisher in 1935. Tobler seems to have come up with the first law independently.

See also

 Arbia's law of geography
 Boundary problem
 Cartography
 Concepts and Techniques in Modern Geography
 Geographic information science
 Geographic information systems
 Indicators of spatial association
 Inverse distance weighting
 Level of analysis
 Modifiable areal unit problem
 Moran's I
 Quantitative geography
 Scientific law
 Spatial heterogeneity
 Technical geography
 Time geography
 The Isolated State
 Transportation geography
 Uncertain geographic context problem
 Urban geography

References

Adages
Empirical laws
Eponyms
Laws of geography
Transportation planning